Havareh Barzeh (also Romanized as Havāreh Barzeh; also known as Havār Barzeh) is a village in Behi-e Feyzolah Beygi Rural District, in the Central District of Bukan County, West Azerbaijan Province, Iran. At the 2006 census, its population was 126, in 20 families.

References 

Populated places in Bukan County